Spey Bay railway station was a railway station in Spey Bay, Moray. The railway station was opened by the Great North of Scotland Railway (GNoSR) on its Moray Firth coast line in 1886, served by Aberdeen to Elgin trains. The station was originally named Fochabers-on-Spey railway station on 1 May 1886.  In November 1893 it became Fochabers railway station,  Fochabers and Spey Bay railway station on 1 January 1916  before finally becoming on 1 January 1918 Spey Bay railway station.  It closed to regular passenger traffic on 6 May 1968 on the same date as the line itself.

In 1923 the GNoSR became part of the London and North Eastern Railway and at nationalisation in 1948 became part of British Railways. The line was recommended for closure by Dr Beeching's report "The Reshaping of British Railways" and closed on 6 May 1968.

History

Background
In 1881 the Great North of Scotland Railway put a bill to parliament to extend its Portsoy line along the Moray Firth as far as  Buckie. In 1882 the Great North of Scotland applied for permission to build a  line from Portsoy following the coast to Buckie and then running on to Elgin.

Great North of Scotland Railway
The GNoSR station opened as Fochabers-on-Spey on 1 May 1886 and to goods on 5 May 1886 with the central section of the coast line, served by through Aberdeen to Elgin trains. In the 1923 Grouping, the Great North of Scotland Railway was absorbed by the  London and North Eastern Railway. This company was nationalised in 1948, and services were then provided by British Railways. The station and line was recommended for closure by Dr Beeching's in his report "The Reshaping of British Railways" and closed on 6 May 1968.

Services
The GNoSR station was served by through trains a day between Aberdeen to Elgin. There were no Sunday services.

The station infrastructure

Spey Bay station had two platforms on a passing loop with a typical wooden station building on the 'Up' line and two wooden signal boxes, one of which has been moved to the Keith and Dufftown Railway. A London and North Eastern Railway style passenger footbridge was present. The 1903 OS map shows a small goods shed and three sidings. The station was host to a LNER camping coach from 1935 to 1939 and possibly one for some of 1934. A 1959 photograph shows a significant number of waggons in the station's sidings, possibly being stored there.

The line was predominantly single track apart from a double track section between Buckie and Portessie. Track lifting took place shortly after closure in 1968. The station site is now a private dwelling with landscaped grounds.

The imposing Spey Viaduct stands on the line between Spey Bay railway station and Garmouth railway station, today (2015) it is only used by walkers taking the Speyside Way route that runs to Buckpool old harbour from Aviemore.

References

Footnotes

Sources

External links
The Spey Viaduct video
Scotlands Places. Spey Bay station.
RAILSCOT on Moray Coast Railway
Railwayana. Photograph of Spey Bay station.
Spey Bay on Flickr.

Former Great North of Scotland Railway stations
Disused railway stations in Moray
Railway stations in Great Britain opened in 1886
Railway stations in Great Britain closed in 1968
Beeching closures in Scotland